The Pinotalca River is a river of Chile.

See also
List of rivers of Chile

References
 EVALUACION DE LOS RECURSOS HIDRICOS SUPERFICIALES EN LA CUENCA DEL RIO BIO BIO

Rivers of Chile
Rivers of Maule Region